Surveys have been conducted in order to construct rankings that assess the success of individuals who have served as Prime Minister of Canada. These historical ranking systems are usually based on surveys of academic historians, economists and political scientists. The rankings focus on the achievements, leadership qualities, failures and faults in office.

Scholar survey results
Canadian custom is to count by the individuals who were prime minister, not by terms. Since Confederation, 23 prime ministers have been "called upon" by the governor general to form 29 Canadian Ministries.
Legend
Blue backgrounds indicate first quartile.
Green backgrounds indicate second quartile.
Orange backgrounds indicate third quartile.
Red backgrounds indicate fourth quartile.

Note: Click the "sort" icon at the head of each column to view the rankings for each survey in numerical order.

Sequence listed by first term as Prime Minister.

* Ranking calculated before the prime minister had left office.

^ Served less than 2 years, 3 months, as Prime Minister, while all others served for more than 4 years, 11 months.  There is a strong correlation between time served in office and the poll rankings: the bottom quartile of the aggregate poll rankings are all in the bottom quartile of time served in office.  Similarly, the top four prime ministers in terms of aggregate rankings are in the top four of time spent in office.

By approval rating 
The following is a list of prime ministers of Canada by their highest and lowest approval rating during their term. The approval rating system came into effect when John Diefenbaker was prime minister (1957–1963).

Highest approval rating 
1. Jean Chrétien — 66% (September 1994)
2. Justin Trudeau — 65% (June 2016)
3. John Diefenbaker — 64% (June 1958)
4. Stephen Harper — 61% (March 2006)
4. Brian Mulroney — 61% (June 1985)
6. Paul Martin — 56% (September 2004)
6. Lester B. Pearson — 56% (January 1966)
8. Pierre Trudeau — 55% (September 1972)
9. Kim Campbell — 53% (July 1993)
10. Joe Clark — 32% (November 1979)

Lowest approval rating 
1. Brian Mulroney — 12% (November 1992)
2. Stephen Harper — 23% (May 2013)
3. Joe Clark — 24% (January 1980)
4. Pierre Trudeau — 25% (September 1982)
5. Justin Trudeau — 31% (August 2019)
6. John Diefenbaker — 34% (March 1963)
7. Jean Chrétien — 36% (June 2000)
8. Paul Martin — 41% (June 2005)
8. Lester B. Pearson — 41% (September 1965)
10. Kim Campbell — 48% (October 1993)

Other surveys 
The Institute for Research on Public Policy undertook a survey to rank the prime ministers who had served in the 50 years preceding 2003. They ranked those nine prime ministers as follows:

Pearson
Mulroney
Pierre Trudeau
St. Laurent
Chrétien
Diefenbaker
Clark ^
Turner ^
Campbell ^

^ Served less than 10 months as Prime Minister, while all others served for more than 4 years, 11 months.

In October 2016, Maclean's again ranked the prime ministers, this time splitting them into two lists. The long-serving prime ministers were ranked as follows:

King
Laurier
Macdonald
Pierre Trudeau
Pearson
St. Laurent
Chrétien
Mulroney
Borden
Harper
Diefenbaker
Mackenzie
Bennett

The short-term prime ministers were ranked as follows:

Martin
Thompson
Meighen
Clark
Tupper
Abbott
Bowell
Turner
Campbell

See also 

List of prime ministers of Canada
Australia, historical rankings of prime ministers
Germany, historical rankings of chancellors
United Kingdom, historical rankings of prime ministers
United States, historical rankings of presidents
The Greatest Canadian, 2004 TV series

References

Further reading 

 Azzi, Stephen, and Norman Hillmer. "Evaluating prime-ministerial performance: The Canadian experience." in Understanding Prime-Ministerial Performance: Comparative Perspectives (2013): 242-263. online
 Azzi, Stephen, and Norman Hillmer. "Ranking Prime Ministers: Canada in a Commonwealth Context." Journal of Imperial and Commonwealth History 49.1 (2021): 22-43. online
 Schwanen, Daniel. "Ranking prime ministers of the last 50 years: The numbers speak." POLICY OPTIONS-MONTREAL 24.6 (2003): 18-23. online

Political history of Canada
Lists of prime ministers of Canada
Canada